Torneio dos Campeões was an official Brazilian football competition, promoted and organized by CBF in 1982.

A group of 18 Brazilian professional football clubs participated in this tournament, including all the champions and the runners-up of all official national competitions ever played in Brazil up to that year (Campeonato Brasileiro, Torneio Rio-São Paulo, Torneio Roberto Gomes Pedrosa) and America-RJ, 18th ranking in the CBF ranking, and Santa Cruz Futebol Clube, ranked 19th in the same ranking. America-RJ and Santa Cruz replaced Flamengo, who declined the invitation in favor of a world tour.

Participants

The tournament
The teams were divided in four groups in the first two rounds, two groups with 5 teams and two groups with four teams in a home-away system. The group champions for each of the two rounds advanced to a quarterfinals bracket.

Results
The following teams advanced to the quarterfinals:

America-RJ
Atlético Mineiro
Bahia
Fluminense
Guarani
Internacional
Portuguesa
São Paulo

In the first two rounds America eliminated Atlético Mineiro, Bahia defeated Internacional, Guarani beat São Paulo, and Portuguesa eliminated Fluminense.

In the semifinals, America-RJ eliminated Portuguesa and Guarani defeated Bahia.

In the championship matches, America-RJ tied Guarani at Brinco de Ouro da Princesa Stadium in Campinas, Brazil (with a score of 1-1) and beat Guarani at Maracanã Stadium in Rio de Janeiro, Brazil (with a final score of 2-1, after a 1-1 at regulation and 1-0 in overtime), in a game played under a lot of rain.

Playoffs

Final

External links
Every game in the Torneio dos Campeões 1982
History of Torneio dos Campeões

1982 in Brazilian football
Defunct football competitions in Brazil